The Haunted Mansion is a dark ride attraction located at Disneyland, Magic Kingdom, and Tokyo Disneyland. The haunted house attraction features a ride-through tour in Omnimover vehicles called "Doom Buggies", and a walk-through show is displayed to riders waiting in the queue line. Each location differs slightly in design, utilizing a range of technology from centuries-old theatrical effects to modern special effects, including spectral Audio-Animatronics. The Haunted Mansion inspired two similarly-themed attractions, Phantom Manor and Mystic Manor, which exist at Disneyland Paris and Hong Kong Disneyland, respectively.

History

Development 
The idea for the Mansion precedes Disneyland and WED Enterprises, dating to when Walt Disney hired the first of his Imagineers. At the time, the park they were developing the attraction for was supposed to be located across from the studios. In 1951, the first known illustration of the park showed a main street setting, green fields, western village and a carnival. Disney Legend Harper Goff developed a black-and-white sketch of a crooked street leading away from main street by a peaceful church and graveyard, with a run-down manor perched high on a hill that towered over main street.

Disney assigned Imagineer Ken Anderson to create a story using Goff's idea. Plans were made to build a New Orleans-themed land in the small transition area between Frontierland and Adventureland. Weeks later, New Orleans Square appeared on the souvenir map and promised a thieves market, a pirate wax museum, and a haunted house walk-through. Anderson studied New Orleans and old plantations, landing on an image of the Shipley-Lydecker House in Baltimore, Maryland. He came up with a drawing of an antebellum manor with features from the Baltimore house, overgrown with weeds, dead trees, swarms of bats and boarded doors and windows topped by a screeching cat as a weather vane.

Disney, however, rejected the idea of having a run-down building in his park. He visited the Winchester Mystery House in San Jose, California, and was captivated by the massive mansion with its stairs to nowhere, doors that opened to walls and holes, and elevators. Anderson envisioned stories for the mansion, including tales of a ghostly sea captain who killed his nosy bride and then hanged himself, a mansion home to an unfortunate family, and a ghostly wedding party with well-known Disney villains and spooks. Imagineers Rolly Crump and Yale Gracey recreated Ken Anderson's stories in a studio at WED Enterprises.

In 1961, handbills announcing a 1963 opening of the Haunted Mansion were given out at Disneyland's main entrance. Construction began a year later, and the exterior was completed in 1963. The attraction was previewed in a 1965 episode of Walt Disney's Wonderful World of Color, but the attraction itself did not open until 1969. The six-year delay owed heavily to Disney's involvement in the New York World's Fair in 1964–1965 and to an attraction redesign after Walt's death in 1966.

After the fair, many Imagineers such as Marc Davis, X Atencio and Claude Coats contributed ideas to the project. By this time, Ken Anderson had left the project. Rolly Crump showed Walt some designs for his version, which included bizarre objects like coffin clocks, candle men, talking chairs, man-eating plants, tiki-like busts, living gypsy wagons and a mirror with a face. Walt accepted these ideas and wanted to make the proclaimed "Museum of the Weird", a restaurant side to the now-named Haunted Mansion, similar to the Blue Bayou at Pirates of the Caribbean. Though this concept was never realized, some of its aspects were implemented into the final attraction.

When Walt put Imagineers Rolly Crump and Yale Gracey in charge of creating illusions for the attraction, they intended to make the "Museum of the Weird" into a separate section that guests could walk through, where they could see transparent ghosts and other apparitions utilizing the Pepper's Ghost technique used in the theater since the early 1800s. Crump and Gracey were eventually given a large workshop to develop their ideas. One night, the two Imagineers decided to play a prank on the night cleaning crew. As Crump explained: "…We got a call from personnel saying that the janitors requested that we leave the lights on in there due to the creepiness of all the audio-animatronic ghosts and such. We complied, but put motion sensors in the room that would extinguish the lights and turn on all the ghost effects when triggered. The next morning, we came in and found all the ghost effects still running and a broom lying in the center of the floor. Personnel called and said that the janitors would not be back."

Marc Davis and Claude Coats, two of the Mansion's main designers, disagreed on whether the ride should be frightening or enjoyable. Coats, originally a background artist, wanted a scary adventure, and produced renditions of moody surroundings like endless hallways, corridors of doors, and bleakly spooky environments. Davis, an animator and character designer, proposed a variety of mostly comical characters, and thought the ride should be silly and full of gags. In the end, both artists got their ways when X Atencio combined their approaches and ideas, creating a transition from dark foreboding to "spirited" entertainment. The ride narration was performed by Paul Frees in the role of the Ghost Host. The attraction's theme song, "Grim Grinning Ghosts", was composed by Buddy Baker with lyrics by Atencio. Different versions of it can be heard in nearly every area of the ride. 

After Disney's death in December 1966, the project evolved significantly. The Museum of the Weird restaurant idea was abandoned. The Imagineers objected to a walk-through attraction's low capacity, going so far as suggesting building two identical attractions to accommodate twice as many guests. A solution appeared with the development of the Omnimover system for Adventure Thru Inner Space. Renamed the Doom Buggy, the system's continuous chain of semi-enclosed vehicles offered high capacity. The cars could be set to rotate in any direction at any point, allowing the Imagineers to control what guests saw and heard. Because each car held from one to three people, it was a convenient way to divide guests into smaller groups—a better fit with the story of people wandering "alone" through a haunted house.

Debut 

Employee previews of the Mansion were held August 6, 7, and the 8th, followed by "soft" openings on August 9 and 10 where limited numbers of park guests were allowed to ride. A "Midnight" Press Event was held on the evening of August 11. The Mansion opened to all guests on August 12, 1969, announced in full-page newspaper ads. It was an immediate success, attracting record crowds and helping the Disney Company recover from Walt's untimely death.

In around 1977, WDI considered utilizing the unused designs, creatures and effects that Rolly Crump had originally created for the Haunted Mansion and the Museum of the Weird as part of Professor Marvel's Gallery—"a tent show of mysteries and delights, a carousel of magic and wonder," to be built as part of Disneyland's Discovery Bay expansion area. The idea was dropped when the expansion's plans fell through.

The attraction opened at Magic Kingdom in 1971 and Tokyo Disneyland in 1983. In 1999, a retrospective, "Art of The Haunted Mansion", was featured at The Disney Gallery above the entrance to Pirates of the Caribbean. When the 2003 film The Haunted Mansion was released, a retrospective of its art was featured in the gallery.

Updates 

In 1994, Disneyland's Haunted Mansion was updated. A phantom piano player sat at a run-down piano in the attic scene, just like the music room at Walt Disney World's Mansion. However, instead of the sinister Rachmaninoff-esque version of "Grim Grinning Ghosts", a dark version of Richard Wagner's Bridal March plays. The beating heart bride's original, unhuman appearance (skeletal or faceless) was replaced with a fully-fleshed version (with its veil either opened or closed), and the pop-up ghosts in that room were given new clothes and said “I do.” In 1996, the attic scene at Magic Kingdom was given some of these changes, but the pianist and piano were not added, and the pop-up ghosts still screamed.

In 2001, a newer, more detailed safety spiel was added to the Doom Buggies' onboard audio as they left the loading area. Recorded by voice-over artist Joe Leahy recreating the character of original actor Paul Frees' Ghost Host, the bilingual spiel was part of a park-wide campaign to increase safety at attractions. The seasonal overlay Haunted Mansion Holiday also premiered that October in Disneyland, featuring characters from the 1993 film The Nightmare Before Christmas.

In 2004, the Seance Room was updated so the crystal ball with the talking head of Madame Leota floated above its table rather than sitting stationary on it, with the original projection-mapped effect replaced by a rear-projection effect within the ball. In addition, a chandelier lampshade was removed from this scene and is now stored in the attic.

In 2006, the beating heart bride in the Attic was replaced by a new bride character named Constance Hatchaway, a serial killer who married wealthy men and killed them for their wealth. The character was added to Walt Disney World's Haunted Mansion in 2007.

In 2007, the Haunted Mansion at Walt Disney World was reopened to the public. Included in the update was a more elaborate transformation of the foyer portrait; new visual and audio effects in the Stretching Room; and a new M.C. Escher-inspired Endless Staircase scene, replacing the two rubber spiders seen just before the Endless Hallway. The painting in the foyer became digital, and the man’s pose in it was reversed.

In March 2011, a new "interactive queue" debuted at the Walt Disney World location, with new crypts and tombstones honoring Imagineers; a murder mystery for guests to solve featuring the sinister Dread Family; the Composer Crypt, which features musical instruments that play variations of "Grim Grinning Ghosts" when touched; the Mariner's brine-filled sepulcher, whose ghost sings and sneezes from within, and a crypt for Prudence Pock the poetess, which features haunted moving books & Prudence's ghost writing invisibly in her poem book. Guests can solve the unfinished poems by speaking into microphones located on the crypt. The FastPass+ line skips the queue altogether and leads guests straight to the Foyer doors. There is also an extended queue line that uses the former Mike Fink Keel Boats dock.

On April 10, 2015, it was officially confirmed that an iconic Haunted Mansion character, The Hatbox Ghost, would return to Disneyland's Haunted Mansion. The character returned on May 9, 2015. The Hatbox Ghost was originally a part of the attraction when it opened in 1969, but was removed when the illusion involving the specter's head was not convincing enough. The character will be added to Walt Disney World's Haunted Mansion in 2023. 

On April 2, 2019, PhotoPass ride photography was added to the attraction at Magic Kingdom. A hidden camera takes pictures of the riders as the doom buggy passes the final portrait in the portrait gallery, with the flash disguised as flickering lightning. A black and white photo featuring the riders framed by several of the ghosts surrounding the photo is automatically added to the guests' PhotoPass account by reading the RFID data from the guest's second-generation MagicBand.

On January 21, 2020, Disneyland's Haunted Mansion was closed for an extensive refurbishment to add lighted steel panels, improved lighting, mechanical touch ups, and new paint and trims to the exterior of the attraction. The changes were originally scheduled for completion in Spring 2020, but an extended park closure due to the COVID-19 pandemic created uncertainty. It was later confirmed that the refurbished attraction would reopen with the park on April 30, 2021. This refurbishment came with a refreshed pet cemetery, now with new greenery and plants. The portrait gallery was given new drapes curtains and the loading area is much more decorative with wallpaper and the return of one of the Haunted Mansion's original portraits being "April to December". Also featuring a statue of the one-eyed cat. The rest of the attraction was given repairs and new lighting. In addition, new secret entrance was added to the ride by using the chicken exit. Once the crypt door opened, visitors would be directed down a flight of stairs and through a utility passageway usually used by cast members.

In 2021, the man in the foyer portrait had his pose changed back to what it was from 1971-2007.

Attractions

Disneyland

Guests enter the mansion's grounds through a gate and walk through a garden containing a pet cemetery and a carriage led by an invisible horse, which occasionally nickers. After making their way onto the porch, guests are ushered into the foyer of the mansion, where the deep voice of the invisible Ghost Host (Paul Frees) delivers a short opening monologue. After that, guests enter the mansion's art gallery which contains four paintings, each depicting a person from the chest up: 

An elderly woman holding a rose.
A bearded man with a piece of paper in his hand.
A parasol-holding woman named Sally Slater.
A man with his arms crossed.

While the Ghost Host challenges guests to find a way out, the room stretches vertically, and the portrait frames appear to elongate, revealing the following grim fates depicted in humorous fashion:

The elderly woman is sitting on a tombstone with a bust of a man named “George” with a hatchet in his head, implying that the woman was an axe murderer.
The bearded man is not wearing any pants and is standing on a dynamite keg with a candle lighting the fuse.
Sally Slater is on a fraying tightrope over an alligator who wants to eat her.
The man with the crossed arms is being carried by another man, who is being carried by a third man, and they are sinking into quicksand.

As the Ghost Host states that the guests can take "his way" out, the room goes dark, the ceiling vanishes, and lightning flashes to reveal the cupola, in which hangs the Ghost Host's skeletal corpse from the rafters by a noose, implying that he committed suicide to try to escape. A shriek is then heard, followed by the sound of bones shattering. After the Ghost Host apologizes to the guests, a wall opens, exposing the portrait corridor leading to the loading area. The subjects of the portraits on the right flicker briefly into macabre versions of themselves when lighting flashes from the windows on the left. These portraits show:

The Werecat Lady: woman on a couch holding a rose turning into an anthropomorphic white tiger (originally a black panther) holding a bone.
The Black Prince: a knight and his horse on a cliff turning into skeleton-like ghosts with the sky darkening.
The Aging Man: a handsome nobleman turning into a skeleton in a rotting suit.
The Flying Dutchman: a ship on calm waters turning into a ghostly version of itself in the middle of a storm.
Medusa: a woman in a Greek temple turning into a stone gorgon in the temple’s ruins.

At the end of the corridor are two busts who appear to "follow" the guests with their gazes.

The guests reach the load area which contains cobwebs and candles, a portrait of a woman named Miss April December who turns from a young woman into a hag, and a statue of a one-eyed cat. Black carriages called Doom Buggies descend one staircase and ascend another to the second floor. A light green fog is in the back of the room. As they board the Doom Buggies, the Ghost Host gives a safety warning and lowers the safety bar. Guests pass by a candelabra floating down an endless hallway. Near the hallway's entrance is a moving suit of armor and a chair with an abstract face. The Doom Buggies then turn to view a glass conservatory filled with dead flora. A casket is also seen, and its occupant (X Atencio) is heard calling out for help to escape. The Doom Buggies then travel down a hallway of doors where sounds of pounding, calls for help, screams, knocking, and maniacal laughter can be heard from behind the doors. Knockers and handles move independently, and some doors appear to be "breathing." Guests then pass by a demonic grandfather clock striking thirteen as the big hand turn backwards with a devil's tail that swings back and forth as a pendulum, while a shadow of a claw passes over it.

Guests enter a dark séance room that contains occult objects. Madame Leota (Eleanor Audley as her voice, Leota Toombs as her face), a blue-haired medium whose disembodied head appears within a levitating crystal ball, summons the Mansion's spirits. Floating musical instruments respond in turn to her spell. 

After leaving the séance circle, guests move onto a balcony overlooking a ballroom where ghosts are enjoying a birthday party. Ghosts fly in the room from a crashed hearse and the windows. Several ghosts sit at the table where one blows out the candles of a birthday cake. Six ghost couples waltz to music, played by a gentleman's spirit on a pipe organ.

Guests enter the attic which is filled with wedding gifts and wedding portraits. In each portrait, the same bride (who is the axe murderer seen in a portrait in the Stretching Room) is seen with a different groom, whose heads disappear only to reappear a moment later. The sound of a beating heart fills the room. They then see an invisible pianist playing a sinister version of the Bridal March and the ghost of the bride, Constance Hatchaway (Kat Cressida), the latter reciting wedding vows. As she raises her arms, a hatchet appears and disappears in her hands between vows.

The Doom Buggies drift out of an attic window and onto a balcony towards the Hatbox Ghost (Corey Burton) amidst a starry night sky. The Doom Buggies then fall backwards underneath dead trees that have humanoid faces. Reaching the ground, they turn towards the gate of a private graveyard, where guests see a frightened caretaker holding a lantern and a shovel with his dog. Around the corner, ghosts have risen from their graves and are partying enthusiastically. Ghouls also pop up from behind the gravestones, some of which appear to move. Guests also pass by a group of five busts (Verne Rowe, Thurl Ravenscroft, Chuck Schroeder, Jay Meyer, and Bob Ebright) singing the attraction's theme song Grim, Grinning Ghosts. As the Doom Buggies approach the entrance of a large crypt, the Ghost Host warns them about hitchhiking ghosts as the Doom Buggies pass a group of three ghosts thumbing for a ride. Around the corner, in large mirrors, the guests see that one of the ghosts from the trio is in the buggy with them. The guests then disembark their Doom Buggies and begin to leave the mansion. A small ghost known as Little Leota (Leota Toombs) encourages them to return and to bring their death certificates.

Magic Kingdom 

The Haunted Mansion was an opening-day attraction at Magic Kingdom in Walt Disney World, where it is part of Liberty Square. During the production and assembly of the props and audio-animatronics for Disneyland's Haunted Mansion, duplicates of everything were being made for Walt Disney World's Haunted Mansion. It was decided that the Florida version of the attraction would be slightly longer and more elaborate than its California counterpart featuring a Library stocked with ghost stories and staring marble busts of great ghost writers, a Music Room where the shadow of an invisible pianist can be seen in the floor, and an Endless Staircase inspired by M. C. Escher's "Relativity". Paul Frees recorded additional voice-overs, including the "Ghost Host" to accompany the extra scenes in the ride. Because of the ample space within the park, the attraction's show building is much larger and not restricted by any railroad berm. When passing the graveyard gates on line, guests see six head busts, two on one stand, that contain the Dread Family: a family that killed each other for wealth. The members are Uncle Jacob, Bertie, Aunt Florence Dread (née McGriffin), twins Wellington and Forsythia, and Cousin Maude. Bertie killed Jacob with poison from his snake, Florence killed Bertie for revenge with her gun, Wellington and Forsythia killed Florence as revenge for Florence doing a rogue shot and killing their pet canary, and Maude killed the twins with her croquet mallet. Maude accidentally killed herself by forgetting that she put matches in her hair to hold her bun together and setting a fire that killed her.

In 2007, the attraction was renovated, with changes including the installation of the changing portraits and lightning-filled windows from the Disneyland version, and new vocals for most of the ghosts in the graveyard. The portrait hall was originally decorated with portraits, known as the Sinister 11, situated on both sides and on a doorway, all of which have eyes that stared at guests as they pass through; these were later transferred to the load area during the refurbishment and their eyes no longer followed guests.

Tokyo Disneyland 
The Haunted Mansion was an opening day attraction at Tokyo Disneyland, where it is part of Fantasyland. The Tokyo Disneyland version is largely a duplicate of the Magic Kingdom version, although it has some minor differences, such as a haunted painting of a man vaguely resembling Peter Lorre whose face pops out and stretches, a tall, legless ghost in the Séance Room, and more advanced lighting. The attraction did not receive the changes made in the 2007 refurbishment of the Magic Kingdom version.

Other versions

Haunted Mansion Holiday 

Due to the success of attractions that feature holiday overlays such as The Country Bear Christmas Special and It's a Small World Holiday, the Haunted Mansion at Disneyland and Tokyo Disneyland is transformed into Haunted Mansion Holiday during the Halloween and Christmas seasons and has been since 2001, inspired by Tim Burton's 1993 film The Nightmare Before Christmas. The Haunted Mansion is closed in mid to late August for a few weeks as they revamp the attraction before opening again in September, replacing many of the props and Audio-Animatronics with characters and themes from the movie. The Haunted Mansion Holiday closes in early January to restore the attraction back to the original Haunted Mansion and reopens late January.

The Magic Kingdom does not have its own holiday edition of the Haunted Mansion and the regular ride operates continuously through the holiday season. The Magic Kingdom was initially supposed to have the overlay as sets, props, and animatronics were created for Magic Kingdom, but they rejected the overlay because Walt Disney World gains more tourists than Disneyland due to being a vacation destination unlike Disneyland being more of a regional theme park with reoccurring guests, so keeping the original ride year-round felt more appropriate. The sets, and props were sent to Tokyo Disneyland as their Haunted Mansion is a duplicate of Magic Kingdom's version.

Related attractions 

Disneyland Paris features Phantom Manor, a "re-imagined" version of the Haunted Mansion. The house is a Western Victorian, in the Second Empire architectural style, based on the look of the Fourth Ward School House in Virginia City, Nevada. Along with the Western architectural style, the attraction uses a Western plot to fit in with the Thunder Mesa and Frontierland backdrop.

Mystic Manor, spiritually inspired by the Haunted Mansion, opened at Hong Kong Disneyland in spring 2013. Unlike the Haunted Mansion, however, it does not include references to departed spirits or the afterlife, due to differences in traditional Chinese culture. Continuing the Society of Explorers and Adventurers theme of Tokyo DisneySea, the attraction tells the story of Lord Henry Mystic and his monkey Albert. Having recently acquired an enchanted music box with the power to bring inanimate objects to life, Albert opens the box and brings all of the house's artifacts to life. The attraction's exterior is that of a large Victorian mansion in an elaborate Queen Anne architectural style, and the experience features a trackless "ride" system and a musical score by Danny Elfman.

In popular culture 
 In 1970, The Wonderful World of Disney featured Disneyland Showtime hosted and narrated by Kurt Russell with appearances by The Osmond Brothers and E. J. Peaker after their concert at Disneyland, they visited the Haunted Mansion at the end.
 Walt Disney Pictures produced a theatrical feature film adaptation based on the attraction and starring Eddie Murphy on November 26, 2003.
 In July 2010, Guillermo del Toro announced that he was set to write and produce a darker film adaptation also based on the attraction, promising that it would be both scary and fun. The film was officially confirmed in July 2021, with Tiffany Haddish playing a hired psychic that attempts to commune with the dead and LaKeith Stanfield playing a lackluster tour guide in New Orleans's French Quarter. The film is scheduled to be released on July 28, 2023.
 In October 2005, Slave Labor Graphics began publishing a bimonthly Haunted Mansion comic book anthology, with the main recurring story (Mystery of the Manse) centered around "Master Gracey" and inspired by the sea captain concepts proposed for the attraction by Ken Anderson in the 1950s.
 In the Mickey Mouse episode "Potatoland", Mickey and Donald build a theme park called Potatoland to fulfil Goofy's lifelong dream to go to the park, even though it never existed. One of the attractions featured was a version of The Haunted Mansion, based on potato horror stories.
 In January 2014, Marvel Comics began publishing Seekers of the Weird, a five-issue miniseries and first under the Disney Kingdoms imprint. The miniseries was based on the Museum of the Weird, Rolly Crump's unused precursor designs for the attraction. In March 2016, Marvel Comics began publishing a five-issue miniseries based on the attraction, released under the Disney Kingdoms imprint.
 A video game produced by Disney Interactive, TDK, and High Voltage Software was released in 2003, primarily based on the attraction but using some of the set designs from the film. The attraction appears and is referenced in other video games, including Epic Mickey and Kinect: Disneyland Adventures. In Epic Mickey, the mansion serves as a level in the game, and borrows elements from each mansion except for Mystic Manor.
 In July 2014, it was announced that a cartoon special based on the attraction, animated by Gris Grimly, was being developed in honor of the 45th anniversary, to be aired on the Disney Channel and Disney XD.
 Madame Leota appears in the second half of the seventh season of ABC's Once Upon a Time, portrayed by Suzy Joachim.
 In the horror video game Bendy and the Ink Machine, the haunted house attraction that appears in the game's fourth chapter is based on the ride.
 In the 2018 film The Predator, the characters enter a large elevator room and a security guard recites part of the Haunted Mansion script "is this haunted room actually stretching?" 
 In October 2018, it was reported that the Magic Kingdom was turning into a popular place for families to deposit ashes of their deceased loved ones, with the Haunted Mansion picked as their favorite location. Disney considers this to be unacceptable and unlawful, and stated that anyone caught doing so will be escorted from Disney property. 
 The Bride, the Hatbox Ghost and the Hitchhiking Ghosts appear as playable characters in the video game Disney Magic Kingdoms, as limited time characters to unlock during Halloween Events.
 In 2020, Funko Games partnered with Disney to release the family strategy board game "Disney: The Haunted Mansion Call of the Spirits."
 In 2021, a Muppets special, Muppets Haunted Mansion, was released on Disney+ on October 8, 2021.
 The Haunted Mansion will appear in a "Chibi Tiny Tale" centered on the Disney TV series The Ghost and Molly McGee.
 In 2022, a Lego set based on the Haunted Mansion was released.

See also 
 The Twilight Zone Tower of Terror

References 

 "Disneyland's Ghost House". (2004). The "E" Ticket (41).This is the Fall 2004 issue of the magazine The "E" Ticket, which was dedicated to the Haunted Mansion at Disneyland.
 Eastman, Tish. (1997). "Haunting Melodies: The Story Behind Buddy Baker's Score for the Haunted Mansion". Persistence of Vision (9) 39.Persistence of Vision is an irregularly published magazine "celebrating the creative legacy of Walt Disney." Back issues can be found at The Book Palace .
 Smith, Paul. (1997). "Tales from the Crypt: Life in the Haunted Mansion." Persistence of Vision (9) 89.
 Surrell, J. (2003). The Haunted Mansion: From the Magic Kingdom to the Movie. New York: Disney Editions. A book published by Disney giving a comprehensive history of the Haunted Mansion from early inception, in which it was a walk-through attraction, to its current form. It includes information on the Haunted Mansion movie.

External links 

 Disneyland Haunted Mansion
 Magic Kingdom Haunted Mansion
 Tokyo Disneyland Haunted Mansion

Amusement rides introduced in 1969
Amusement rides introduced in 1971
Amusement rides introduced in 1983
Amusement rides manufactured by Arrow Dynamics
Audio-Animatronic attractions
Dark rides
Disneyland
Fantasyland
Haunted attractions (simulated)
 
Liberty Square (Magic Kingdom)
Louisiana in fiction
Magic Kingdom
New Orleans Square (Disneyland)
New York (state) in fiction
Omnimover attractions
Southern United States in fiction
Tokyo Disneyland
Cultural depictions of Medusa
1969 establishments in California
1971 establishments in Florida
1983 establishments in Japan
Ghosts in popular culture
Fictional houses
Fiction about witchcraft
Works about fictional serial killers